Raymond Nelson Skilton (September 26, 1889 – July 1, 1961) was an American ice hockey defenseman who played one game in the National Hockey League for the Montreal Wanderers. The rest of his career was spent playing amateur hockey in the Boston area, and he retired in 1923.

Playing career

Skilton was working as a munitions expert posted by the U.S. government in Montreal and offered the Wanderers $1 to play in the NHL. His lone game came on December 22, 1917 against the Montreal Canadiens. Statistical records suggest Skilton returned to amateur hockey in the Boston area after World War I.

Career statistics

Regular season and playoffs

See also
List of players who played only one game in the NHL

References

External links
 

1889 births
1961 deaths
American men's ice hockey defensemen
Ice hockey players from Massachusetts
Montreal Wanderers (NHL) players
Montreal Wanderers players
Sportspeople from Cambridge, Massachusetts